Every Breath You Take: The Singles is the debut compilation album by the Police, released in 1986. In 1990, the album was repackaged in New Zealand, Australia and Spain as Their Greatest Hits with a different cover.

A video collection entitled Every Breath You Take: The Videos was released alongside the album. It was released on VHS and Betamax cassette, as well as on Laserdisc in the UK, Europe and in Japan. The collection featured fourteen promotional videos, for twelve of the thirteen tracks on the album as well as "Synchronicity II"  and the original version of "Don't Stand So Close to Me".

Background
In the aftermath of their Synchronicity Tour in 1984, the Police announced that they were taking a pause of reflection before recording a new album. The same year Andy Summers released a second album of instrumental music with Robert Fripp, Bewitched. Stewart Copeland worked on the soundtrack of the Francis Ford Coppola's film Rumble Fish, with the single "Don't Box Me In" peaking at No. 91 in the UK Singles Chart. In 1985 Sting released his first solo album, The Dream of the Blue Turtles, with great critical and commercial success. The album was followed by an extensive promotional tour, that resulted in a double live album, Bring on the Night. In 1985 Copeland started working on The Rhythmatist, an ambitious project that led him to spend a significant amount of time recording and filming in Congo. About one year later Summers scored the soundtrack for the film Down and Out in Beverly Hills.

By the time the trio reconvened to play three concerts for the Amnesty International A Conspiracy of Hope Tour in June 1986, the atmosphere was tense. According to Sting, "It was a very symbolic moment. We'd broken up, then sort of reformed to do the Amnesty Tour. U2 were there as well and as we closed our set with "Invisible Sun", Bono came out and sang it with us. And then we symbolically handed our instruments over to U2, because they were about to become what we were — the biggest band in the world".

In July the band booked time in the studio to record a new album. In the liner notes to the Police's box set Message in a Box, Summers recalled: "The attempt to record a new album was doomed from the outset. The night before we went into the studio Stewart broke his collarbone falling off a horse and that meant we lost our last chance of recovering some rapport just by jamming together. Anyway, it was clear Sting had no real intention of writing any new songs for the Police. It was an empty exercise." With Copeland unable to play the drums, the short-lived reunion resulted in an attempt to re-record some of their previous hits. Copeland opted to use his Fairlight CMI to program the drum tracks but Sting pushed to use the drums on his Synclavier instead. As the group's engineer found the Synclavier's programming interface difficult, it ended up taking him two days to complete the task. Copeland ultimately finished the drum programming and claimed that the Fairlight's "Page R" (the device's sequencing page) saved his life and put him on the map as a composer. In a Qantas inflight radio program named "Reeling in the Years", Copeland was quoted as saying that the argument over Synclavier versus Fairlight drums was "the straw that broke the camel's back," and that this led to the group's unravelling.

"Don't Stand So Close to Me '86" was released in October 1986 as the final single from The Police. "De Do Do Do De Da Da Da" was also recorded but the band was unsatisfied with the result, and as such it was shelved, only to be subsequently included on the DTS-CD release of the Every Breath You Take: The Classics album in 1995.

As to signify the poor atmosphere pervading the session, the three band members did not appear together in the photograph on the album cover, nor in the video shot by Godley & Creme to promote "Don't Stand So Close to Me '86". Following the release of the album, the Police effectively disbanded.

Reception
Every Breath You Take: The Singles reached No. 1 in the UK album charts and No. 7 in the US charts. "Don't Stand So Close to Me '86"  made it into the UK Top 25.

Track listing

Cassette/CD version in U.K./Europe only

Personnel
 Sting – lead and backing vocals, bass, keyboards, saxophone on "Spirits in the Material World"
 Andy Summers – electric guitar, keyboards
 Stewart Copeland – drums, miscellaneous percussion, keyboards, drum programming on "Don't Stand So Close to Me '86"
 Jean Roussel - piano on "Every Little Thing She Does Is Magic"

Every Breath You Take: The Classics
In 1995, A&M released Every Breath You Take: The Classics (renamed The Police Greatest Hits (digitally remastered) in 1996) to replace the original album.  It features a slightly different track listing: the original version of "Don't Stand So Close to Me" replaces the 1986 recording at track 5; the '86 version appears at track 13. A « New Classic Rock Mix » of "Message in a Bottle" is included as track 14. The Digital Theater System (2000) and hybrid Super Audio CD (2003) versions of the album include a previously unreleased version of "De Do Do Do, De Da Da Da".

In the DTS version, "Every Little Thing She Does Is Magic" features a different intro. Also, The Singles featured a shortened version of "Can't Stand Losing You" which featured an early fade out which ends the song before the final chorus concludes; The Classics replaces this with the full-length version.

Track listing

Charts

Weekly charts

Year-end charts

Certifications and sales

Notes

1986 greatest hits albums
Albums produced by Hugh Padgham
The Police compilation albums
A&M Records compilation albums
Albums produced by Nigel Gray